The Mukaiyama aldol addition is an organic reaction and a type of aldol reaction between a silyl enol ether and an aldehyde or formate. The reaction was discovered by Teruaki Mukaiyama (1927–2018) in 1973. His choice of reactants allows for a crossed aldol reaction between an aldehyde and a ketone or a different aldehyde without self-condensation of the aldehyde. For this reason the reaction is used extensively in organic synthesis.

General reaction scheme
The Mukaiyama aldol addition is a Lewis acid mediated addition of enol silanes to carbonyl compounds. In this reaction compounds with various organic groups can be used (see educts).
A basic version (R2 = H) without the presence of chiral catalysts is shown below.

A racemic mix of enantiomers is built. If Z- or E-enol silanes are used in this reaction a mixture of four products occurs, yielding two racemates.

Whether the anti-diastereomer or the syn-diastereomer is built depends largely on reaction conditions, substrates and Lewis acids.

The archetypical reaction is that of the silyl enol ether of cyclohexanone with benzaldehyde. At room temperature it produces a diastereomeric mixture of threo (63%) and erythro (19%) β-hydroxyketone as well as 6% of the exocyclic enone condensation product. In its original scope the Lewis acid (titanium tetrachloride) was used in stoichiometric amounts but truly catalytic systems exist as well. The reaction is also optimized for asymmetric synthesis.

Mechanism
Below, the reaction mechanism is shown with R2 = H:

In the cited example the Lewis acid TiCl4 is used. First, the Lewis acid activates the aldehyde component followed by carbon-carbon bond formation between the enol silane and the activated aldehyde.
With the loss of a chlorosilane the compound 1 is built. The desired product, a racemate of 2 and 3, is obtained by aqueous work-up.

Scope
A typical reaction involving two ketones is that between acetophenone as the enol and acetone:

Ketone reactions of this type require higher reaction temperatures. For this work Mukaiyama was inspired by earlier work done by Georg Wittig in 1966 on crossed aldol reactions with lithiated imines. Competing work with lithium enolate aldol reactions was published also in 1973 by Herbert O. House.

Mukaiyama employed in his rendition of taxol total synthesis (1999) two aldol additions, one with a ketene silyl acetal and excess magnesium bromide:

and a second one with an amine chiral ligand and a triflate salt catalyst:

Utilization of chiral Lewis acid complexes and Lewis bases in asymmetric catalytic processes is the fastest-growing area in the usage of the Mukaiyama aldol reaction.

References

Addition reactions
Name reactions